Clifton-on-Trent railway station is a former railway station between North Clifton and South Clifton in eastern  Nottinghamshire, England.

Context
The station was opened in 1896 by the Lancashire, Derbyshire and East Coast Railway on its main line from Chesterfield to Lincoln. It was closed by British Railways in 1955.

The station was at the eastern end of Fledborough Viaduct, which crosses the River Trent. It was a short walk to the river and was popular with anglers.

Former services
There never was a Sunday service at Clifton-on-Trent.

All these trains called at Clifton.

From 1951 trains stopped running through to Chesterfield, turning back at Shirebrook North instead. Otherwise the same pattern continued until the last train on 17 September 1955.

Trains continued to pass, including Summer excursions which continued until 1964, but the picture was of progressive decline. A derailment at Clifton itself on 21 February 1980 led to the immediate closure of the line from High Marnham Power Station through the station to Pyewipe Junction. These tracks were subsequently lifted.

Modern times
Today the trackbed eastwards from the site of Fledborough Station, across Fledborough Viaduct, through Clifton to Doddington & Harby forms an off-road part of National Cycle Route 647 which is part of the National Cycle Network.

From Harby onwards through the site of  almost to Pyewipe Junction the trackbed forms an off-road part of National Cycle Route 64.

References

Sources

Further reading

External links
Clifton-on-Trent station on old OS map npe Maps

Disused railway stations in Nottinghamshire
Former Lancashire, Derbyshire and East Coast Railway stations
Railway stations in Great Britain opened in 1896
Railway stations in Great Britain closed in 1955
Newark and Sherwood